Kazunari is a masculine Japanese given name.

Possible writings
Kazunari can be written using different kanji characters and can mean:
和成, "peace/harmony, become"
一成, "one, become"
一就, "one, settle

People with the name
, Japanese baseball player
, Japanese footballer
, Japanese footballer
, Japanese baseball player
, Japanese footballer
, Japanese voice actor
, Japanese professional wrestler and mixed martial artist
, Japanese idol, singer, songwriter, actor, voice actor and radio host
, Japanese footballer
, Japanese footballer
, Japanese samurai
, Japanese baseball player
, Japanese cross-country skier
, Japanese voice actor
, Japanese baseball player
, Japanese cyclist

Japanese masculine given names